The Suzuki Gemma is a motor scooter introduced as a concept motorcycle at the Tokyo Motor Show in October 2007, and commercially available in Japan beginning in 2008. It is not a step-through frame design like most scooters; instead, there is a cargo compartment ahead of the operator and between the operator's legs.

The 250 cc single-cylinder gasoline engine is shared with the Suzuki Burgman 250 scooter.

References

Notes

Sources

External links

 
Suzuki 2000s products, Suzuki Global

Motor scooters
Gemma
Motorcycles introduced in 2007